Matthew Young Middleton (24 October 1907 – 1979) was an English footballer who played as a goalkeeper in the Football League for Southport, Sunderland, Bradford City and York City. He was born in Boldon Colliery, County Durham, the brother of Ray Middleton who also played League football.

References

External links
Full details of Sunderland career

1907 births
1979 deaths
People from The Boldons
Footballers from Tyne and Wear
English footballers
Association football goalkeepers
Boldon Community Association F.C. players
Southport F.C. players
Sunderland A.F.C. players
Plymouth Argyle F.C. players
Darlington Town F.C. players
Bradford City A.F.C. players
York City F.C. players
Blyth Spartans A.F.C. players
Murton A.F.C. players
English Football League players